Bondevik's First Cabinet governed Norway between 17 October 1997 to 17 March 2000. It was led by Prime Minister Kjell Magne Bondevik, and consisted of the Christian Democratic Party, the Centre Party and the Liberal Party. There was a major reshuffle in March 1999. It had the following composition:

Cabinet members

 
|}

State Secretaries

References
Kjell Magne Bondeviks første regjering 1997-2000 – Regjeringen.no

Notes

Bondevik 1
Bondevik 1
Bondevik 1
Bondevik 1
1997 establishments in Norway
2000 disestablishments in Norway
Cabinets established in 1997
Cabinets disestablished in 2000